The 1987–88 season was Paris Saint-Germain's 18th season in existence. PSG played their home league games at the Parc des Princes in Paris, registering an average attendance of 19,507 spectators per match. The club was presided by Francis Borelli. The team was coached by Gérard Houllier until October 1987. Erick Mombaerts took over as manager from October to December. Houllier returned in February 1988 for the second half of the campaign. Fabrice Poullain was the team captain.

Summary

PSG's championship-winning team continued to break apart in 1987–88 as Dominique Rocheteau also left the club. World-class midfielders Gabriel Calderón and Ray Wilkins arrived in Paris but could not turn the tide either. Wilkins only played ten matches before joining Rangers in December 1987. Their last-place finish in the Tournoi de Paris, a first since 1976, predicted the way things would unfold. Following a run of seven defeats in eight games, Gérard Houllier took a step back and became the club's sporting director in October 1987.

Erick Mombaerts was named manager but he also failed to steer the ship and PSG finished the year in the relegation zone, prompting Houllier's return in February 1988 for the second half of the campaign. Paris reached its lowest point in late April 1988, when they lost 0–4 against Nice at the Parc des Princes. Still the club's record home league defeat, it plunged them back into third from bottom with only five games remaining. Earlier that month, PSG had also suffered their biggest away cup defeat. It was a 0–3 loss to Sochaux in the French Cup last-32 stage (eliminated 1–6 on aggregate). They rallied up just in time, though, Daniel Xuereb scoring the only goal of the game away to Le Havre on the final matchday to avoid the drop with a dramatic 15th-placed finish. With top-flight status secured, Houllier left the club in June 1988 following the end of the season.

Players 

As of the 1987–88 season.

Squad

Out on loan

Transfers 

As of the 1987–88 season.

Arrivals

Departures

Kits 

French radio RTL and French premium television channel Canal+ were the shirt sponsors. German sportswear brand Adidas was the kit manufacturer.

Friendly tournaments

Mundialito de Clubs

Tournoi de Paris

Tournoi Indoor de Paris-Bercy

First group stage (Group B)

Second group stage (Ranking Group)

Competitions

Overview

Division 1

League table

Results by round

Matches

Coupe de France

Round of 64

Round of 32

Statistics 

As of the 1987–88 season.

Appearances and goals 

|-
!colspan="16" style="background:#dcdcdc; text-align:center"|Goalkeepers

|-
!colspan="16" style="background:#dcdcdc; text-align:center"|Defenders

|-
!colspan="16" style="background:#dcdcdc; text-align:center"|Midfielders

|-
!colspan="16" style="background:#dcdcdc; text-align:center"|Forwards

|-
!colspan="16" style="background:#dcdcdc; text-align:center"|Players transferred / loaned out during the season

|-

References

External links 

Official websites
 PSG.FR - Site officiel du Paris Saint-Germain
 Paris Saint-Germain - Ligue 1 
 Paris Saint-Germain - UEFA.com

Paris Saint-Germain F.C. seasons
French football clubs 1987–88 season